Willie Francis (January 12, 1929 – May 9, 1947) was an African American teenager known for surviving a failed execution by electrocution in the United States.  He was a convicted juvenile sentenced to death at age 16 by the state of Louisiana in 1945 for the murder of Andrew Thomas, a Cajun pharmacy owner in St. Martinville who had once employed him. He was 17 when he survived the first attempt to execute him, as the chair malfunctioned. After an appeal of his case taken to the US Supreme Court failed, he was executed in 1947 at age 18.

Arrest and trial 
In 1944, Andrew Thomas, a pharmacist in St. Martinville, Louisiana, was shot and killed. His murder remained unsolved for nine months, but in August 1945, Willie Francis was detained in Texas due to his proximity to an unrelated crime. Police claimed that he was carrying Thomas' wallet in his pocket, though no evidence of this claim was submitted during the trial.

Francis initially named several others in connection with the murder, but the police dismissed these claims. A short time later, while under interrogation, Francis confessed to Thomas' murder, writing, "It was a secret about me and him."  He had no counsel with him. The meaning of his statement is still uncertain. Author Gilbert King, in his book, The Execution of Willie Francis (2008), alludes to rumors in St. Martinville of sexual abuse of the youth by the pharmacist. Francis later directed the police to where he had disposed of the holster used to carry the murder weapon. The gun used to kill Thomas was found near the crime scene. It belonged to a deputy sheriff in St. Martinville who had once threatened to kill Thomas. The gun, and the bullets recovered from the crime scene and Thomas' body, disappeared from police evidence just before the trial.

Despite two separate written confessions, Francis pleaded not guilty. During his trial, the court-appointed defense attorneys offered no objections, called no witnesses, and put up no defense.  The validity of Francis' confessions were not questioned by the defense, although he had no counsel at the time. Two days after the trial began, Francis was quickly convicted of murder and was sentenced to death by twelve White jurors and the judge despite Francis having been underage at 15 at the time of the crime.

Execution attempt, appeal, and second execution 
On May 3, 1946, Francis survived an attempt at execution by the electric chair. Witnesses reported hearing the teenager scream from behind the leather hood, "Take it off! Take it off! Let me breathe!" as the supposedly lethal surge of electricity was being applied. The portable electric chair, known as "Gruesome Gertie", was found to have been improperly set up by an intoxicated prison guard and inmate from the Louisiana State Penitentiary at Angola. The sheriff, E.L. Resweber, was later quoted as saying: "This boy really got a shock when they turned that machine on."

After the botched execution, a young lawyer, Bertrand DeBlanc, decided to take Francis' case. He felt it was unjust, and cruel and unusual punishment, as prohibited in the Constitution, to subject him again to the execution process. DeBlanc had been best friends with Thomas and his decision was greeted with dismay by the citizens in the small Cajun town.  DeBlanc took Francis' case to the Supreme Court in Francis v. Resweber, 329 U.S. 459 (1947), citing various violations of his Fifth, Eighth, and Fourteenth Amendment rights. These included violations of equal protection, double jeopardy, and cruel and unusual punishment.

The US Supreme Court rejected the appeal. Subsequently, Willie Francis was returned to the electric chair on May 9, 1947. He told reporter Elliott Chaze a couple of days prior to the execution that he was going to meet the Lord with his "Sunday pants and Sunday heart." He was pronounced dead in the chair at 12:10 p.m. (CST).

Documentary 
Willie Francis' life was the subject of a 2006 documentary, titled Willie Francis Must Die Again, written and directed by filmmaker Allan Durand. The film, narrated by actor Danny Glover, chronicles the full story of his case and the unprecedented court battle that followed his failed execution. Produced by regional film director/producer Glen Pitre, the film includes first hand accounts of Francis' original trial, interviews with Sister Helen Prejean, author of Dead Man Walking, a book about the death penalty, and Gilbert King, author of The Execution of Willie Francis (2008); and cultural perspective provided by director Allan Durand.

In popular media 
Ernest Gaines' 1993 novel A Lesson Before Dying, telling the story of a young black man facing execution in 1940s Louisiana, was partly based on the Willie Francis case.

See also 
 Capital punishment in Louisiana
 Capital punishment in the United States
 Francis v. Resweber
 John Babbacombe Lee
 Joseph Samuel
 Pedro Medina

References

Bibliography

External links 
 Supreme Court case history
 Gilbert King, The Execution of Willie Francis, official website of book  
 Top 10 Amazing Execution Survival Stories

1929 births
1947 deaths
20th-century executions by Louisiana
20th-century executions of American people
Minors convicted of murder
American people executed for murder
Executed African-American people
People convicted of murder by Louisiana
Execution survivors
People executed by Louisiana by electric chair
Juvenile offenders executed by the United States